Bhisawa is a village development committee in Parsa District in the Narayani Zone of southern Nepal. At the time of the 2011 Nepal census, it had a population of 5,735 living in 829 individual households. There were 2,920 males and 2,815 females at the time of census.

References

Populated places in Parsa District